Parliamentary elections were held in Bolivia on 20 June 1958. The Revolutionary Nationalist Movement (MNR) received 85% of the vote, and retained its large majorities in both houses of Congress.

Results

References

Elections in Bolivia
Bolivia
Election and referendum articles with incomplete results
1958 in Bolivia